The 1998 FIBA World Championship squads were the squads of the 1998 FIBA World Championship.  The list includes the 12-men rosters of the 16 participating countries, totaling 192 players.

Group A

Canada

Head coach: Steve Konchalski

Greece

Head coach: Panagiotis Giannakis

Italy

Head coach: Bogdan Tanjević

Senegal

Head coach: Ousseynou Ndiaga Diop

Group B

Japan

Head coach: Mototaka Kohama

Puerto Rico

Head coach: Carlos Morales

Russia

Head coach: Sergei Belov

FR Yugoslavia

Head coach: Željko Obradović

Group C

Brazil

Head coach: Hélio Rubens Garcia

Lithuania

Head coach: Jonas Kazlauskas

South Korea

Head coach: Chung Kwang-suk

United States

Head coach: Rudy Tomjanovich

Group D

Argentina

Head coach: Julio Lamas

Australia

Head coach:

Nigeria

Head coach:

Spain

Head coach: Lolo Sainz

References
1998 FIBA World Championship at basket-stats.info

External links
 
 

FIBA Basketball World Cup squads
squads